

Events

Pre-1600
 654 – Pope Eugene I elected to succeed Martinus I.
 955 – Battle of Lechfeld: Otto I, Holy Roman Emperor defeats the Magyars, ending 50 years of Magyar invasion of the West.
 991 – Battle of Maldon: The English, led by Byrhtnoth, Ealdorman of Essex, are defeated by a band of inland-raiding Vikings near Maldon, Essex.
1030 – The Battle of Azaz ends with a humiliating retreat of the Byzantine emperor, Romanos III Argyros, against the Mirdasid rulers of Aleppo. The retreat degenerates into a rout, in which Romanos himself barely escapes capture.
1270 – Yekuno Amlak takes the imperial throne of Ethiopia, restoring the Solomonic dynasty to power after a 100-year Zagwe interregnum.
1316 – The Second Battle of Athenry takes place near Athenry during the Bruce campaign in Ireland.
1346 – Jaume Ferrer sets out from Majorca for the "River of Gold", the Senegal River.
1512 – The naval Battle of Saint-Mathieu, during the War of the League of Cambrai, sees the simultaneous destruction of the Breton ship La Cordelière and the English ship The Regent.
1519 – Ferdinand Magellan's five ships set sail from Seville to circumnavigate the globe. The Basque second-in-command Juan Sebastián Elcano will complete the expedition after Magellan's death in the Philippines.
1557 – Battle of St. Quentin: Spanish victory over the French in the Italian War of 1551–59.
1585 – The Treaty of Nonsuch signed by Elizabeth I of England and the Dutch Rebels.

1601–1900
1641 – The Treaty of London between England and Scotland, ending the Bishops' Wars, is signed.
1680 – The Pueblo Revolt begins in New Mexico.
1741 – King Marthanda Varma of Travancore defeats the Dutch East India Company at the Battle of Colachel, effectively bringing about the end of the Dutch colonial rule in India. 
1755 – Under the direction of Charles Lawrence, the British begin to forcibly deport the Acadians from Nova Scotia to the Thirteen Colonies and France.
1792 – French Revolution: Storming of the Tuileries Palace: Louis XVI of France is arrested and taken into custody as his Swiss Guards are massacred by the Parisian mob.
1856 – The Last Island hurricane strikes Louisiana, resulting in over 200 deaths.
1861 – American Civil War: Battle of Wilson's Creek: A mixed force of Confederate, Missouri State Guard, and Arkansas State troops defeat outnumbered attacking Union forces in the southwestern part of the state.
1864 – After Uruguay's governing Blanco Party refuses Brazil's demands, José Antônio Saraiva announces that the Brazilian military will begin reprisals, beginning the Uruguayan War.

1901–present
1901 – The U.S. Steel recognition strike by the Amalgamated Association of Iron and Steel Workers begins.
1904 – Russo-Japanese War: The Battle of the Yellow Sea between the Russian and Japanese battleship fleets takes place.
1905 – Russo-Japanese War: Peace negotiations begin in Portsmouth, New Hampshire.
1913 – Second Balkan War: Delegates from Bulgaria, Romania, Serbia, Montenegro, and Greece sign the Treaty of Bucharest, ending the war.
1920 – World War I: Ottoman sultan Mehmed VI's representatives sign the Treaty of Sèvres that divides up the Ottoman Empire between the Allies.
1937 – Spanish Civil War: The Regional Defence Council of Aragon is dissolved by the Second Spanish Republic.
1944 – World War II: The Battle of Guam comes to an effective end.
  1944   – World War II: The Battle of Narva ends with a defensive German victory.
1948 – Candid Camera makes its television debut after being on radio for a year as Candid Microphone.
1949 – An amendment to the National Security Act of 1947 enhances the authority of the United States Secretary of Defense over the Army, Navy and Air Force, and replaces the National Military Establishment with the Department of Defense.
1953 – First Indochina War: The French Union withdraws its forces from Operation Camargue against the Viet Minh in central Vietnam.
1954 – At Massena, New York, the groundbreaking ceremony for the Saint Lawrence Seaway is held.
1961 – Vietnam War: The U.S. Army begins Operation Ranch Hand, spraying an estimated  of defoliants and herbicides over rural areas of South Vietnam in an attempt to deprive the Viet Cong of food and vegetation cover.
1966 – The Heron Road Bridge collapses while being built, killing nine workers in the deadliest construction accident in both Ottawa and Ontario.
1969 – A day after murdering Sharon Tate and four others, members of Charles Manson's cult kill Leno and Rosemary LaBianca.
1971 – The Society for American Baseball Research is founded in Cooperstown, New York.
1977 – In Yonkers, New York, 24-year-old postal employee David Berkowitz ("Son of Sam") is arrested for a series of killings in the New York City area over the period of one year.
1978 – Three members of the Ulrich family are killed in an accident. This leads to the Ford Pinto litigation.
1981 – Murder of Adam Walsh: The head of John Walsh's son is found. This inspires the creation of the television series America's Most Wanted and the National Center for Missing & Exploited Children.
1988 – Japanese American internment: U.S. President Ronald Reagan signs the Civil Liberties Act of 1988, providing $20,000 payments to Japanese Americans who were either interned in or relocated by the United States during World War II.
1990 – The Magellan space probe reaches Venus.
1993 – Two earthquakes affect New Zealand. A 7.0  shock (intensity VI (Strong)) in the South Island was followed nine hours later by a 6.4  event (intensity VII (Very strong)) in the North Island.
1995 – Oklahoma City bombing: Timothy McVeigh and Terry Nichols are indicted for the bombing. Michael Fortier pleads guilty in a plea-bargain for his testimony.
1997 – Sixteen people are killed when Formosa Airlines Flight 7601 crashes near Beigan Airport in the Matsu Islands of Taiwan.
1998 – HRH Prince Al-Muhtadee Billah is proclaimed the crown prince of Brunei with a Royal Proclamation.
1999 – Los Angeles Jewish Community Center shooting.
2001 – The 2001 Angola train attack occurred, causing 252 deaths.
  2001   – Space Shuttle program: The Space Shuttle Discovery is launched on STS-105 to the International Space Station, carrying the astronauts of Expedition 3 to replace the crew of Expedition 2.
2003 – The Okinawa Urban Monorail is opened in Naha, Okinawa.
2009 – Twenty people are killed in Handlová, Trenčín Region, in the deadliest mining disaster in Slovakia's history.
2012 – The Marikana massacre begins near Rustenburg, South Africa, resulting in the deaths of 47 people.
2014 – Forty people are killed when Sepahan Airlines Flight 5915 crashes at Tehran's Mehrabad International Airport.
2018 – Horizon Air employee Richard Russell hijacks and performs an unauthorized takeoff on a Horizon Air Bombardier Dash 8 Q400 plane at Seattle–Tacoma International Airport in Washington, flying it for more than an hour before crashing the plane and killing himself on Ketron Island in Puget Sound.
  2018   – An anti-government rally turns into a riot when members of the Romanian Gendarmerie attack the 100,000 people protesting in front of the Victoria Palace, leading to 452 recorded injuries. The authorities alleged that the crowd was infiltrated by hooligans who began attacking law enforcement agents.
2019 – Thirty-two are killed and one million are evacuated as Typhoon Lekima makes landfall in Zhejiang, China. Earlier it had caused flooding in the Philippines.
2020 – Derecho in Iowa becomes the most costly thunderstorm disaster in U.S. history.

Births

Pre-1600
 941 – Lê Hoàn, Vietnamese emperor (d. 1005)
1267 – James II of Aragon (d. 1327)
1296 – John of Bohemia (d. 1346)
1360 – Francesco Zabarella, Italian cardinal (d. 1417)
1397 – Albert II of Germany (d. 1439)
1439 – Anne of York, Duchess of Exeter, Duchess of York (d. 1476)
1449 – Bona of Savoy, Duchess of Savoy (d. 1503)
1466 – Francesco II Gonzaga, Marquess of Mantua (d. 1519)
1489 – Jacob Sturm von Sturmeck, German lawyer and politician (d. 1553)
1520 – Madeleine of Valois (d. 1537)
1528 – Eric II, Duke of Brunswick-Lüneburg (d. 1584)
1547 – Francis II, Duke of Saxe-Lauenburg (d. 1619)
1560 – Hieronymus Praetorius, German organist and composer (d. 1629)

1601–1900
1602 – Gilles de Roberval, French mathematician and academic (d. 1675)
1645 – Eusebio Kino, Italian priest and missionary (d. 1711)
1734 – Naungdawgyi, Burmese king (d. 1763)
1737 – Anton Losenko, Russian painter and academic (d. 1773)
1740 – Samuel Arnold, English organist and composer (d. 1802)
1744 – Alexandrine Le Normant d'Étiolles, daughter of Madame de Pompadour (d. 1754)
1755 – Narayan Rao, fifth Peshwa of the Maratha Empire (d. 1773)
1782 – Vicente Guerrero, Mexican insurgent leader and President of Mexico (d. 1831)
1805 – Ferenc Toldy, German-Hungarian historian and critic (d. 1875)
1809 – John Kirk Townsend, American ornithologist and explorer (d. 1851)
1810 – Camillo Benso, Count of Cavour, Italian soldier and politician, 1st Prime Minister of Italy (d. 1861)
1814 – Henri Nestlé, German businessman, founded Nestlé (d. 1890)
  1814   – John C. Pemberton, United States soldier and Confederate general (d. 1881)
1821 – Jay Cooke, American financier, founded Jay Cooke & Company (d. 1905)
1823 – Hugh Stowell Brown, English minister and reformer (d. 1886)
1825 – István Türr, Hungarian soldier, architect, and engineer, co-designed the Corinth Canal (d. 1908)
1827 – Lovro Toman, Slovenian lawyer and politician (d. 1870) 
1839 – Aleksandr Stoletov, Russian physicist and academic (d. 1896)
1845 – Abai Qunanbaiuli, Kazakh poet, composer, and philosopher (d. 1904)
1848 – William Harnett, Irish-American painter and educator (d. 1892)
1856 – William Willett, English inventor, founded British Summer Time (d. 1915)
1860 – Vishnu Narayan Bhatkhande, Indian singer and musicologist (d. 1936)
1865 – Alexander Glazunov, Russian composer, conductor, and educator (d. 1936)
1868 – Hugo Eckener, German pilot and businessman (d. 1954)
1869 – Laurence Binyon, English poet, playwright, and scholar (d. 1943)
1870 – Trần Tế Xương, Vietnamese poet and satirist (d. 1907)
1872 – William Manuel Johnson, American bassist (d. 1972)
1874 – Herbert Hoover, American engineer and politician, 31st President of the United States (d. 1964)
1874 – Antanas Smetona, Lithuanian jurist and politician, President of Lithuania (d. 1944)
1877 – Frank Marshall, American chess player and author (d. 1944)
1878 – Alfred Döblin, Polish-German physician and author (d. 1957)
1880 – Robert L. Thornton, American businessman and politician, Mayor of Dallas (d. 1964)
1884 – Panait Istrati, Romanian journalist and author (d. 1935)
1888 – Prince Christopher of Greece and Denmark (d. 1940)
1889 – Charles Darrow, American game designer, created Monopoly (d. 1967)
  1889   – Zofia Kossak-Szczucka, Polish writer and member of the WW II Polish Resistance (d. 1968)
1890 – Angus Lewis Macdonald, Canadian lawyer and politician, 12th Premier of Nova Scotia (d. 1954)
1894 – V. V. Giri, Indian lawyer and politician, 4th President of India (d. 1980) 
1895 – Hammy Love, Australian cricketer (d. 1969)
1897 – John W. Galbreath, American businessman and philanthropist, founded Darby Dan Farm (d. 1988)
  1897   – Jack Haley, American actor and singer (d. 1979)
1900 – Arthur Porritt, Baron Porritt, New Zealand physician and politician, 11th Governor-General of New Zealand (d. 1994)

1901–present
1902 – Norma Shearer, Canadian-American actress (d. 1983)
  1902   – Curt Siodmak, German-English author and screenwriter (d. 2000)
  1902   – Arne Tiselius, Swedish biochemist and academic, Nobel Prize laureate (d. 1971)
1903 – Ward Moore, American author (d. 1978)
1905 – Era Bell Thompson, American journalist and author (d. 1986)
1907 – Su Yu, Chinese general and politician (d. 1984)
1908 – Rica Erickson, Australian botanist, historian, and author (d. 2009)
  1908   – Billy Gonsalves, American soccer player (d. 1977)
1909 – Leo Fender, American businessman, founded Fender Musical Instruments Corporation (d. 1991)
  1909   – Richard J. Hughes, American politician, 45th Governor of New Jersey, and Chief Justice of the New Jersey Supreme Court (d. 1992)
1910 – Guy Mairesse, French racing driver (d. 1954)
1911 – Leonidas Andrianopoulos, Greek footballer (d. 2011)
  1911   – A. N. Sherwin-White, English historian and author (d. 1993)
1912 – Jorge Amado, Brazilian novelist and poet (d. 2001)
1913 – Noah Beery Jr., American actor (d. 1994) 
  1913   – Kalevi Kotkas, Estonian-Finnish high jumper and discus thrower (d. 1983)
  1913   – Wolfgang Paul, German physicist and academic, Nobel Prize laureate (d. 1993)
1914 – Jeff Corey, American actor and director (d. 2002)
  1914   – Carlos Menditeguy, Argentinian racing driver and polo player (d. 1973)
  1914   – Ray Smith, English cricketer (d. 1996)
1918 – Eugene P. Wilkinson, American admiral (d. 2013)
1920 – Red Holzman, American basketball player and coach (d. 1998)
1922 – Al Alberts, American pop singer and composer (d. 2009)
1923 – Bill Doolittle, American football player and coach (d. 2014)
  1923   – Rhonda Fleming, American actress (d. 2020)
  1923   – Fred Ridgway, English cricketer and footballer (d. 2015)
  1923   – SM Sultan, Bangladeshi painter and illustrator (d. 1994)
1924 – Nancy Buckingham, English author
  1924   – Martha Hyer, American actress (d. 2014)
  1924   – Jean-François Lyotard,  French philosopher, sociologist, and literary theorist (d. 1998)
1925 – George Cooper, English general (d. 2020)
1926 – Marie-Claire Alain, French organist and educator (d. 2013)
  1926   – Carol Ruth Vander Velde, American mathematician (d. 1972)
1927 – Jimmy Martin, American singer and guitarist (d. 2005)
  1927   – Vernon Washington, American actor (d. 1988)
1928 – Jimmy Dean, American singer, actor, and businessman, founded the Jimmy Dean Food Company  (d. 2010)
  1928   – Eddie Fisher, American singer and actor (d. 2010)
  1928   – Gerino Gerini, Italian racing driver (d. 2013)
  1928   – Gus Mercurio, American-Australian actor (d. 2010)
1930 – Barry Unsworth, English-Italian author and academic (d. 2012)
1931 – Dolores Alexander, American journalist and activist (d. 2008)
  1931   – Tom Laughlin, American actor, director, producer, and screenwriter (d. 2013)
1932 – Alexander Goehr, English composer and academic
  1932   – Gaudencio Rosales, Filipino cardinal
1933 – Elizabeth Butler-Sloss, Baroness Butler-Sloss, English lawyer and judge
  1933   – Rocky Colavito,  American baseball player and sportscaster
  1933   – Keith Duckworth, English engineer, founded Cosworth (d. 2005)
1934 – Tevfik Kış, Turkish wrestler and trainer (d. 2019)
1935 – Ian Stewart, Baron Stewartby, English politician, Minister of State for the Armed Forces (d. 2018)
  1935   – Ad van Luyn, Dutch bishop
1936 – Malene Schwartz, Danish actress
1937 – Anatoly Sobchak, Russian scholar and politician, Mayor of Saint Petersburg (d. 2000)
1938 – Tony Ross, English author and illustrator
1939 – Kate O'Mara, English actress (d. 2014)
  1939   – Charlie Rose, American lawyer and politician (d. 2012)
1940 – Bobby Hatfield, American singer-songwriter (d. 2003)
  1940   – Sid Waddell, English sportscaster (d. 2012)
1941 – Anita Lonsbrough, English swimmer and journalist
  1941   – Susan Dorothea White, Australian painter and sculptor
1942 – Speedy Duncan, American football player (d. 2021) 
  1942   – Betsey Johnson, American fashion designer
  1942   – Michael Pepper, English physicist and engineer
1943 – Louise Forestier, Canadian singer-songwriter and actress
  1943   – Jimmy Griffin, American singer-songwriter and guitarist (d. 2005)
  1943   – Michael Mantler, American trumpet player and composer 
  1943   – Shafqat Rana, Indian-Pakistani cricketer
  1943   – Ronnie Spector, American singer-songwriter (d. 2022)
1947 – Ian Anderson, Scottish-English singer-songwriter and guitarist 
  1947 – Anwar Ibrahim, Malaysian academic and politician, 10th Prime Minister of Malaysia
  1947   – John Spencer, English rugby player and manager
  1947   – Alan Ward, English cricketer
1948 – Nick Stringer, English actor 
1950 – Patti Austin, American singer-songwriter 
1951 – Juan Manuel Santos, Colombian businessman and politician, 59th President of Colombia
1952 – Daniel Hugh Kelly, American actor
  1952   – Diane Venora, American actress
1954 – Peter Endrulat, German footballer
  1954   – Rick Overton, American screenwriter, actor and comedian
1955 – Jim Mees, American set designer (d. 2013)
  1955   – Mel Tiangco, Filipino journalist and talk show host
1956 – Dianne Fromholtz, Australian tennis player
  1956   – José Luis Montes, Spanish footballer and manager (d. 2013)
  1956   – Fred Ottman, American wrestler
  1956   – Charlie Peacock, American singer-songwriter, pianist, and producer
  1956   – Perween Warsi, Indian-English businesswoman
1957 – Fred Ho, American saxophonist, composer, and playwright (d. 2014)
  1957   – Andres Põime, Estonian architect 
  1957   – Aqeel Abbas Jafari, Pakistani writer, poet, architect and chief editor Urdu Dictionary Board
1958 – Michael Dokes, American boxer (d. 2012) 
  1958   – Jack Richards, English cricketer, coach, and manager
  1958   – Rosie Winterton, English nurse and politician, Shadow Leader of the House of Commons
1959 – Rosanna Arquette, American actress, director, and producer
  1959   – Albert Owen, Welsh sailor and politician
  1959   – Mark Price, English drummer 
  1959   – Florent Vollant, Canadian singer-songwriter 
1960 – Antonio Banderas, Spanish actor and producer
  1960   – Annely Ojastu, Estonian sprinter and long jumper
  1960   – Kenny Perry, American golfer
1961 – Jon Farriss, Australian drummer, songwriter, and producer 
1962 – Suzanne Collins, American author and screenwriter
  1962   – Julia Fordham, English singer-songwriter
1963 – Phoolan Devi, Indian lawyer and politician (d. 2001)
  1963   – Anton Janssen, Dutch footballer and coach
  1963   – Andrew Sullivan, English-American journalist and author
1964 – Aaron Hall, American singer-songwriter 
  1964   – Kåre Kolve, Norwegian saxophonist and composer
  1964   – Hiro Takahashi, Japanese singer-songwriter and guitarist (d. 2005)
1965 – Claudia Christian, American actress, singer, writer, and director
  1965   – Mike E. Smith, American jockey and sportscaster
  1965   – John Starks, American basketball player and coach
1966 – Charlie Dimmock, English gardener and television host
  1966   – Hansi Kürsch, German singer-songwriter and bass player 
1967 – Philippe Albert, Belgian footballer and sportscaster
  1967   – Riddick Bowe, American boxer
  1967   – Gus Johnson, American sportscaster
  1967   – Todd Nichols, American singer-songwriter and guitarist 
  1967   – Reinout Scholte, Dutch cricketer
1968 – Michael Bivins, American singer and producer
  1968   – Greg Hawgood, Canadian ice hockey player and coach
1969 – Emily Symons, Australian actress
  1969   – Brian Drummond, Canadian voice actor
1970 – Doug Flach, American tennis player
  1970   – Bret Hedican, American ice hockey player and sportscaster
  1970   – Brendon Julian, New Zealand-Australian cricketer and journalist
  1970   – Steve Mautone, Australian footballer and coach
1971 – Sal Fasano, American baseball player and coach
  1971   – Stephan Groth, Danish singer-songwriter 
  1971   – Roy Keane, Irish footballer and manager
  1971   – Mario Kindelán, Cuban boxer
  1971   – Paul Newlove, English rugby player
  1971   – Kevin Randleman, American mixed martial artist and wrestler (d. 2016)
  1971   – Justin Theroux, American actor
1972 – Dilana, South African singer-songwriter and actress
  1972   – Lawrence Dallaglio, English rugby player and sportscaster
  1972   – Angie Harmon, American model and actress
  1972   – Christofer Johnsson, Swedish singer-songwriter, guitarist, and producer 
1973 – Lisa Raymond, American tennis player
  1973   – Javier Zanetti, Argentinian footballer
1974 – Haifaa al-Mansour, Saudi Arabian director and producer
  1974   – Luis Marín, Costa Rican footballer and manager
  1974   – Rachel Simmons, American scholar and author
  1974   – David Sommeil, French footballer
1975 – İlhan Mansız, Turkish footballer and figure skater
1976 – Roadkill, American wrestler
  1976   – Ian Murray, Scottish businessman and politician, Shadow Secretary of State for Scotland
1977 – Danny Griffin, Irish footballer
  1977   – Matt Morgan, English comedian, actor, and radio host
1978 – Danny Allsopp, Australian footballer
  1978   – Marcus Fizer, American basketball player
  1978   – Chris Read, English cricketer
1979 – JoAnna Garcia, American actress
  1979   – Dinusha Fernando, Sri Lankan cricketer
  1979   – Ted Geoghegan, American author, screenwriter, and producer
  1979   – Brandon Lyon, American baseball player
  1979   – Rémy Martin, French rugby player
  1979   – Matjaž Perc, Slovene physicist
  1979   – Yannick Schroeder, French racing driver
1980 – Wade Barrett, English boxer, wrestler, and actor
1981 – Taufik Hidayat, Indonesian badminton player
1982 – John Alvbåge, Swedish footballer
  1982   – Josh Anderson, American baseball player
  1982   – Julia Melim, Brazilian actress
1983 – Kyle Brown, American soccer player
  1983   – C. B. Dollaway, American mixed martial artist
  1983   – Héctor Faubel, Spanish motorcycle racer
  1983   – Alexander Perezhogin, Russian ice hockey player
  1983   – Mathieu Roy, Canadian ice hockey player 
1984 – Ryan Eggold, American actor and composer
  1984   – Mokomichi Hayami, Japanese model and actor
  1984   – Jigar Naik, English cricketer
1985 – Enrico Cortese, Italian footballer
  1985   – Roy O'Donovan, Irish footballer
  1985   – Kakuryū Rikisaburō, Mongolian sumo wrestler
  1985   – Julia Skripnik, Estonian tennis player
1986 – Andrea Hlaváčková, Czech tennis player
1987 – Jim Bakkum, Dutch singer and actor
  1987   – Ari Boyland, New Zealand actor and singer
1989 – Sam Gagner, Canadian ice hockey player
  1989   – Ben Sahar, Israeli footballer
  1989   – Brenton Thwaites, Australian actor
1990 – Cruze Ah-Nau, Australian rugby player
1990   – Lee Sung-kyung, South Korean model, actress, and singer
1991 – Marcus Foligno, American-Canadian ice hockey player
  1991   – Chris Tremain, Australian cricketer
  1991   – Dagný Brynjarsdóttir, Icelandic footballer
  1991   – Nikos Korovesis, Greek footballer
1993 – Andre Drummond, American basketball player
1994 – Bernardo Silva, Portuguese footballer
1996 – Lauren Tait, Scottish netball player
2000 – Sophia Smith, American soccer player

Deaths

Pre-1600
 258 – Lawrence of Rome, Spanish-Italian deacon and saint (b. 225)
 794 – Fastrada, Frankish noblewoman (b. 765)
 796 – Eanbald, archbishop of York
 847 – Al-Wathiq, Abbasid caliph (b. 816)
 955 – Bulcsú, Hungarian tribal chieftain (horka)
   955   – Conrad ('the Red'), duke of Lorraine
1241 – Eleanor, Fair Maid of Brittany (b. 1184)
1250 – Eric IV of Denmark (b. 1216)
1284 – Tekuder, Khan of the Mongol Ilkhanate 
1316 – Felim mac Aedh Ua Conchobair, King of Connacht
1322 – John of La Verna, Italian ascetic (b. 1259)
1410 – Louis II, Duke of Bourbon (b. 1337)
1535 – Ippolito de' Medici, Italian cardinal (b. 1509)
1536 – Francis III, Duke of Brittany, Dauphin of France, Brother of Henry II (b. 1518)

1601–1900
1653 – Maarten Tromp, Dutch admiral (b. 1598)
1655 – Alfonso de la Cueva, 1st Marquis of Bedmar, Spanish cardinal and diplomat (b. 1572)
1660 – Esmé Stewart, 2nd Duke of Richmond (b. 1649)
1723 – Guillaume Dubois, French cardinal and politician, French Secretary of State for Foreign Affairs (b. 1656)
1759 – Ferdinand VI of Spain (b. 1713)
1784 – Allan Ramsay, Scottish-English painter (b. 1713)
1796 – Ignaz Anton von Indermauer, Austrian nobleman and government official (b. 1759)
1802 – Franz Aepinus, German-Russian philosopher and academic (b. 1724)
1806 – Michael Haydn, Austrian composer and educator (b. 1737)
1839 – Sir John St Aubyn, 5th Baronet, English lawyer and politician (b. 1758)
1862 – Hon'inbō Shūsaku, Japanese Go player (b. 1829)
1875 – Karl Andree, German geographer and journalist (b. 1808)
1889 – Arthur Böttcher, German pathologist and anatomist (b. 1831)
1890 – John Boyle O'Reilly, Irish-born poet, journalist and fiction writer (b. 1844)
1896 – Otto Lilienthal, German pilot and engineer (b. 1848)

1901–present
1904 – Pierre Waldeck-Rousseau, French lawyer and politician, 68th Prime Minister of France (b. 1846)
1913 – Johannes Linnankoski, Finnish author (b. 1869)
1915 – Henry Moseley, English physicist and engineer (b. 1887)
1916 – John J. Loud, American inventor (b. 1844)
1918 – Erich Löwenhardt, German lieutenant and pilot (b. 1897)
1920 – Ádám Politzer, Hungarian-Austrian physician and academic (b. 1835)
1922 – Reginald Dunne, Irish Republican, executed for the killing of Sir Henry Wilson
1922 – Joseph O'Sullivan, Irish Republican, executed for the killing of Sir Henry Wilson 
1929 – Pierre Fatou, French mathematician and astronomer (b. 1878)
  1929   – Aletta Jacobs, Dutch physician (b. 1854)
1932 – Rin Tin Tin, American acting dog (b. 1918)
1933 – Alf Morgans, Welsh-Australian politician, 4th Premier of Western Australia (b. 1850)
1945 – Robert H. Goddard, American physicist and engineer (b. 1882)
1948 – Kan'ichi Asakawa, Japanese-American historian, author, and academic (b. 1873)
  1948   – Andrew Brown, Scottish footballer and coach (b. 1870)
  1948   – Montague Summers, English clergyman and author (b. 1880)
1949 – Homer Burton Adkins, American chemist (b. 1892)
1954 – Robert Adair, American-born British actor (b. 1900)
1958 – Frank Demaree, American baseball player and manager (b. 1910)
1960 – Hamide Ayşe Sultan, Ottoman princess (b. 1887)
1961 – Julia Peterkin, American author (b. 1880)
1963 – Estes Kefauver, American lawyer and politician (b. 1903)
  1963   – Ernst Wetter, Swiss lawyer and jurist (b. 1877)
1969 – János Kodolányi, Hungarian author (b. 1899)
1976 – Bert Oldfield, Australian cricketer (b. 1894)
1979 – Dick Foran, American actor and singer (b. 1910)
  1979   – Walter Gerlach, German physicist and academic (b. 1889)
1980 – Yahya Khan, Pakistani general and politician, 3rd President of Pakistan (b. 1917)
1982 – Anderson Bigode Herzer, Brazilian author and poet (b. 1962)
1985 – Nate Barragar, American football player and sergeant (b. 1906)
1987 – Georgios Athanasiadis-Novas, Greek lawyer and politician, 163rd Prime Minister of Greece (b. 1893)
1991 – Lưu Trọng Lư, Vietnamese poet and playwright (b. 1912)
1993 – Euronymous, Norwegian singer, guitarist, and producer (b. 1968)
1997 – Jean-Claude Lauzon, Canadian director and screenwriter (b. 1953)
  1997   – Conlon Nancarrow, American-Mexican pianist and composer (b. 1912)
1999 – Jennifer Paterson, English chef and television presenter (b. 1928)
  1999   – Baldev Upadhyaya, Indian historian, scholar, and critic (b. 1899)
2000 – Gilbert Parkhouse, Welsh cricketer and rugby player (b. 1925)
2001 – Lou Boudreau, American baseball player and manager (b. 1917)
2002 – Michael Houser, American singer-songwriter and guitarist (b. 1962)
  2002   – Kristen Nygaard, Norwegian computer scientist and politician (b. 1926)
2007 – Henry Cabot Lodge Bohler, American lieutenant and pilot (b. 1925)
  2007   – James E. Faust, American lawyer and religious leader (b. 1920)
  2007   – Jean Rédélé, French race car driver and pilot, founded Alpine (b. 1922)
  2007   – Tony Wilson, English journalist, producer, and manager, co-founded Factory Records (b. 1950)
2008 – Isaac Hayes, American singer-songwriter, pianist, producer, and actor (b. 1942)
2010 – Markus Liebherr, German-Swiss businessman (b. 1948)
  2010   – Adam Stansfield, English footballer (b. 1978)
  2010   – David L. Wolper, American director and producer (b. 1928)
2011 – Billy Grammer, American singer-songwriter and guitarist (b. 1925)
2012 – Philippe Bugalski, French race car driver (b. 1963)
  2012   – Ioan Dicezare, Romanian general and pilot (b. 1916)
  2012   – Irving Fein, American producer and manager (b. 1911)
  2012   – William W. Momyer, American general and pilot (b. 1916)
  2012   – Carlo Rambaldi, Italian special effects artist (b. 1925)
2013 – William P. Clark Jr., American judge and politician, 12th United States National Security Advisor (b. 1931)
  2013   – Jonathan Dawson, Australian historian and academic (b. 1941)
  2013   – Eydie Gormé, American singer and actress (b. 1928)
  2013   – David C. Jones, American general (b. 1921)
  2013   – Jody Payne, American singer and guitarist (b. 1936)
  2013   – Amy Wallace, American author (b. 1955)
2014 – Jim Command, American baseball player and scout (b. 1928)
  2014   – Dotty Lynch, American journalist and academic (b. 1945)
  2014   – Kathleen Ollerenshaw, English mathematician, astronomer, and politician, Lord Mayor of Manchester (b. 1912)
  2014   – Bob Wiesler, American baseball player (b. 1930)
2015 – Buddy Baker, American race car driver and sportscaster (b. 1941)
  2015   – Endre Czeizel, Hungarian physician, geneticist, and academic (b. 1935)
  2015   – Knut Osnes, Norwegian footballer and coach (b. 1922)
  2015   – Eriek Verpale, Belgian author and poet (b. 1952)
2017 – Ruth Pfau, German-Pakistani doctor and nun (b. 1929)
2019 – Jeffrey Epstein, American financier (b. 1953)
2021 – Tony Esposito, Canadian-American ice hockey player (b. 1943)
2022 – Vesa-Matti Loiri, Finnish actor, musician and comedian (b. 1945)

Holidays and observances
 Argentine Air Force Day (Argentina)
 Christian feast day:
 Bessus
 Blane (Roman Catholic Church)
 Geraint of Dumnonia
 Lawrence of Rome
 Nicola Saggio
 Nuestra Señora del Buen Suceso de Parañaque, Patroness of Parañaque, Philippines
 August 10 (Eastern Orthodox liturgics)
 Declaration of Independence of Quito, proclaimed independence from Spain on August 10, 1809. Independence was finally attained on May 24, 1822, at the Battle of Pichincha. (Ecuador)
 International Biodiesel Day
 National Veterans Day (Indonesia)

References

External links

 
 
 

Days of the year
August